The Famine is a 1915 American silent short drama film directed by George Osborne and featuring Sessue Hayakawa and Tsuru Aoki.

References

External links 
 

American silent short films
American black-and-white films
1915 drama films
1915 films
Silent American drama films
Films directed by George Osborne
1915 short films
1910s English-language films
1910s American films